Extended Power is an EP by the German heavy metal band Rage, released in 1991. It contains a new song, leftovers of the writing sessions for previous albums and the remake of the song "Battlefield" from the first Avenger album Prayers of Steel (albeit with different lyrics, reflected by the name "Bottlefield").

Track listing

Personnel
Band members
Peter "Peavy" Wagner – lead and backing vocals, bass
Manni Schmidt – electric and acoustic guitars, backing vocals
Chris Ephthimiadis – drums

Production
Armin Sabol – producer
Sven Conquest – engineer
Ralf Krause – engineer, mixing
Karl-Ulrich Walterbach – executive producer

References

Rage (German band) albums
1991 EPs
Noise Records EPs